Thracia is the Latin name of Thrace.
It may refer to:
the (territory of the) Thracian Odrysian kingdom
Roman Thrace
the Roman/Byzantine Diocese of Thrace
the Byzantine (medieval) theme of Thrace, see Thrace (theme)
Thracia (bivalve), a bivalve genus
Fire Emblem: Thracia 776, a game in the Fire Emblem series

See also
Thracians
Eastern Thrace
Western Thrace
History of Bulgaria